Juan "Brok" Harris (born 22 February 1985) is a South African rugby union footballer. He matriculated from Hoërskool Bastion in Krugersdorp, after which he attended Potchefstroom University. He plays as a prop for the Stormers having returned from the Welsh Pro14 side Dragons where he played between 2014 and 2021. He previously played for the Stormers in Super Rugby and Western Province in the Currie Cup.

Harris can play on both sides of the scrum, and, in 2017, he had spent the required three years in Wales to qualify for the Welsh national side on residency grounds.

References

External links
WP rugby profile
Stormers profile

Profile at Its rugby
Dragons Rugby Profile

1985 births
Living people
South African rugby union players
Stormers players
Western Province (rugby union) players
Rugby union props
Afrikaner people
Rugby union players from Johannesburg
Dragons RFC players